The skunk loach, skunk botia or Hora's loach (Yasuhikotakia morleti; syn. Botia morleti, Botia horae) is a species of botiid loach found in the Mekong River basin in Indochina, as well as the Chao Phraya and Mae Klong basins in Thailand.  The maximum size is 10 cm (4 in) and it occurs in water with parameters 26 - 30 °C (79 to 86 °F) temperature, pH 6.0 to 8.0,  hardness 5.0 to 12.0.  It feeds on live crustaceans, insects, snails and other invertebrates.

Despite being seen frequently in the aquarium trade, skunk loaches tend to be a naturally territorial fish, and will chase any (and all) other tankmates, regardless of size. Thus they may not suitable for community-style tanks, unless part of that community consists of a small school of skunk botia; a school can create a hierarchy amongst themselves and spread out their natural tension evenly. Smaller fish and bottom feeders in the tank can be pursued, attacked and/or killed. If not physically maimed, the stress of chasing is often enough to kill smaller peaceful fishes. Caution and observation as well as having 3 or more may prevent this. A minimum of 3 to 5  individuals would be optimal, if not seven or more. The minimum aquarium size for a group of skunk botia (in a community tank) should be at least 20 or 30 gallons, with bigger always being better when possible. Their naturally short body length of one to two inches makes this not impossible to achieve in smaller tanks, though.

A  two-year observation within an aquarium tank has revealed some unique interactions  about this fish. The observed tank has had 10-15 (currently 15) of the skunk botia. The fish has not shown any aggression towards other fish in the tank, likely due to their substantial grouping together. fish in the tank include several different tetra species, including, at one time or another, bleeding-heart tetras, long-finned serpae tetras, black phantom tetras, and black neon tetras. There were also swordtail, Corydoras catfish, male & female betta, and plecostomus. At no time has the skunk loaches shown any aggression towards any of the other community fish. Observation has also shown that they tend to stay to their own species and have established a community at peace with each other. In the observation tank, small caves were created where they eventually started sharing space as a group. 

The skunk botia has yet to be bred in captivity.

Skunk botia require a high-protein diet. Live foods are best. Frozen foods, such as bloodworms, brine shrimp, daphnia, krill, and tubifex worms are well liked. They do like an occasional flake food, as well as various crushed wafer foods. Their nose and body shape is naturally evolved to consume mollusks and crustaceans; all species of botia will readily hunt and consume any species of pond snail, baby crabs, or small shrimps (such as Amano shrimp Or cherry shrimp) that are present in their aquarium, provided it is small enough. This includes predatory and cannibalistic snails, such as the assassin snail.

 List of freshwater aquarium fish species

References 
 
 
 Riehl R, Baensch HA (1996) Aquarium Atlas. Vol 1. pg: 368.

Botiidae
Fish of Southeast Asia
Fish of Thailand
Fish described in 1885
Taxa named by Gilbert Tirant